Always Be the Winners is a 1994 Hong Kong comedy film directed by Jacky Pang and starring Tony Leung Chiu-Wai, Tony Leung Ka-fai, Eric Tsang, Sandra Ng, Ekin Cheng and Charine Chan. The film was released during the Chinese New Year period of 1994 to celebrate the holidays.

Plot
Third Master Sha (Tony Leung Chiu-Wai) is a descendant of a powerful gambling family who must battle Yam Tin-sau (Ekin Cheng), the descendant of the rival gambling family to save his family's name. In order to win, Hui hires the China King of Gamblers Hui Man-lung (Tony Leung Ka-fai) for help.

Cast
Tony Leung Chiu-Wai as Third Master Sha
Tony Leung Ka-fai as Hui Man-lung, the China King of Gamblers
Eric Tsang as Nanny
Sandra Ng as Mrs. Lulu Sha
Ekin Cheng as Yam Tin-sau
Charine Chan as Sha's third sister
Au Gan as Sha's second sister
Teresa Mak as Scarlet Pimpernel
Lo Hung as Nightclub patron
Keni Tanigaki as Photographer

See also
Ekin Cheng filmography

External links

Always Be the Winners at Hong Kong Cinemagic

Always Be the Winners film review at LoveHKFilm.com

1994 films
1994 comedy films
Hong Kong slapstick comedy films
Films about gambling
1990s Cantonese-language films
Films set in Hong Kong
Films shot in Hong Kong
Regal Entertainment films
1990s Hong Kong films